Danielle Kelly (born December 4, 1995) is an American submission grappler and Brazilian jiu-jitsu black belt who is currently competing in ONE Championship. She holds wins over fighters such as Roxanne Modafferi, Cynthia Calvillo and the former UFC Women's Strawweight Champion Carla Esparza.

Career

Fury Pro Grappling 
Kelly fought against Cathryn Millares in the co-main event of Fury Pro Grappling 2 on October 29, 2021 and won the match by unanimous decision.Kelly was scheduled to face Rose Namajunas at Fury Pro Grappling 3 on December 30, 2021. However, Namajunas was forced to withdraw from the event at the last minute due to a positive Covid-19 test and was replaced by Carla Esparza. During the match, Esparza slammed Kelly from full guard and the resulting clash of heads opened up a cut above Esparza's eyebrow. The doctors attending called the match off and the victory was awarded to Kelly as a result of the injury.

Who's Number One 
Kelly made her debut for Who's Number One on February 26, 2021 at WNO: Craig Jones v Ronaldo Junior, where she lost a unanimous decision to Jessa Khan. She returned on June 18, 2021 at WNO: Craig Jones v Tye Ruotolo and submitted Jessica Crane with a kneebar in the first match of the event. These performances earned her an invitation to compete for a title in the Women's Strawweight division of the Who's Number One Championships on September 25-26, 2021. Kelly lost by unanimous decision to Grace Gundrum in the opening round, before submitting Jessica Crane with a heelhook in the first round of the consolation bracket. She was then submitted with an armlock by Tammi Musumeci and did not make it to the third-place final match.

ONE Championship 
On February 17, 2022, it was announced that Kelly signed with ONE Championship to compete in grappling, as well as mixed martial arts if she wished to.

Kelly made her promotional debut against Japanese veteran Mei Yamaguchi in an atomweight submission grappling match at ONE: X on March 26, 2022. The match ended in a draw after neither could find the submission. This win earned her the Performance of the Night award.

Kelly faced Sambo World Champion Mariia Molchanova at ONE on Prime Video 4 on November 18, 2022. She won the fight via rear-naked choke. This win earned her the Performance of the Night award.

Kelly was scheduled to face Ayaka Miura at ONE Fight Night 7 on February 24, 2023. She won the match by unanimous decision.

Other Promotions 
Kelly fought UFC veteran Roxanne Modafferi in the main event of Submission Hunter Pro 60 on October 25, 2020, submitting her with a toehold.

She fought at the inaugural UFC Fightpass Invitational on December 16, 2021, taking on Alexa Yanes. Kelly lost the match via split decision.

Instructor lineage 
Kano Jigoro → Tomita Tsunejirō → Mitsuyo Maeda → Carlos Gracie Sr. → Hélio Gracie → Rolls Gracie → Carlos Gracie Jr. → Renzo Gracie → Karel Pavec → Danielle Kelly

Championships and accomplishments 

 ONE Championship
 Performance of the Night (Two times) 
 RISE Invitational
 Rise Invitational 3 125 lbs Championship (2018)
Submission Hunter Pro
SHP 130lbs No Gi Champion

Submission grappling record

References 

American practitioners of Brazilian jiu-jitsu
Living people
People awarded a black belt in Brazilian jiu-jitsu
American submission wrestlers
1995 births
Submission grapplers